Gorbani is an unpopulated rural locality (aul) in Dzheyrakhsky District of the Republic of Ingushetia, Russia. Gorbani is one of the six rural localities comprising Dzheyrakh rural settlement.

In 2013 a plant for the production of dolomite flour was built in Gorbani.

References

Rural localities in Ingushetia